DZRP (94.5 FM), broadcasting as 94.5 Radyo Partido FMR, is a radio station owned and operated by the Partido Development Administration. The station's studio is located at Brgy. Matacla, Goa, and its transmitter is located in Lagonoy, Camarines Sur.

Initially a community radio for the Partido district, it became an affiliate of the FMR Network in October 2021.

References

Radio stations in Camarines Sur